Nikola Zivanović (born February 21, 1996) is a Serbian-Greek professional footballer who plays as a defensive midfielder for AO Anixis.

Honours

AEK Athens
Football League 2: 2013–14(6th Group)

External links
 http://www.sports-academies.gr/component/content/article/1731-sports
 http://www.football-academies.gr/scoutmagazine/9895-zivanivic-atromitos.html
 http://www.atromitosfc.gr/index.php?option=com_content&view=article&id=1367:%CE%BF%CE%BC%CE%B1%CE%B4%CE%B1-%CE%BA20&catid=13&Itemid=107&lang=gr

1996 births
Living people
Serbian footballers
Greek footballers
AEK Athens F.C. players
Association football midfielders